British rapper and singer M.I.A. has released six studio albums, two extended plays, two mixtapes, forty singles (including eight as a featured artist) and twenty-nine music videos. Born Mathangi "Maya" Arulpragasam, M.I.A. began her career as a visual artist and film-maker, and moved into making music after filming a documentary on the band Elastica in 2001. The band's lead singer, Justine Frischmann, lent her a Roland MC-505 sequencer/drum machine which she used to make a demo tape that secured her a contract with British label XL Recordings.

M.I.A.'s debut studio album, Arular, was initially scheduled to be released in September 2004, but the release was delayed by six months due to problems with the clearance of samples used in the songs. She released two singles and a mixtape in the interim. Although the album had limited commercial success, it was highly regarded by music critics for its blending of genres such as grime, hip hop, ragga and Brazilian baile funk, and for its politicised lyrics. Music magazines in the United States and Europe included it in lists of the best albums of the year, and it was nominated for the Mercury Prize in the United Kingdom.

Her second album, Kala, was released in 2007 along with the single "Boyz" and was also praised by critics, drawing more extensively from African, Tamil and Caribbean music. It proved much more commercially successful than her debut, reaching number 18 on the US Billboard 200 and number 21 on the UK Albums Chart. "Paper Planes", the album's fourth and final single, became M.I.A.'s breakthrough hit and was nominated for Record of the Year at the 51st Annual Grammy Awards. The song appeared on the soundtrack to the 2008 film Slumdog Millionaire along with "O... Saya", a song written specifically for the film by M.I.A. and A. R. Rahman. The song, which appears on the film's soundtrack album, was released on M.I.A.'s own label N.E.E.T. and was nominated for Best Original Song at the 81st Academy Awards.

Her third album, Maya, was released in 2010 and reached the top 10 in numerous countries, remaining her highest-charting album both in the UK and the US. Her fourth album, Matangi, was released in 2013, charting moderately in music markets, despite receiving strong feedback from both public and critics. Her fifth album, AIM, was released on 9 September 2016. In 2020, she was featured along with Young Thug on Travis Scott's single "Franchise", which debuted atop the U.S. Billboard Hot 100, becoming her first Hot 100 number-one single.

Albums

Studio albums

Mixtapes

Extended plays

Singles

As lead artist

As featured artist

Other charted songs

Guest appearances

Music videos

As lead artist

As featured artist

Notes

References

External links
 
 
 
 

Discography
Discographies of British artists
Discographies of Sri Lankan artists
Electronic music discographies
Hip hop discographies